The Coldwell Complex is a large circular gabbro and syenite intrusion within the Earth's crust.

Formation

The Coldwell Complex has its origins in the Midcontinent Rift System about 1,100 million years ago. It is an exposed magma chamber that formed beneath the surface causing surface swelling to occur. This swelling turned into an active volcano, erupting basaltic magma. 600 million years ago, the volcano walls became so large and heavy, they caved in on the volcano, acting as a cap. The magma then became trapped in the magma chamber where it settled and cooled with other minerals causing the initial phases of the complex. Glacial erosion stripped away the top layers of the volcano. Today, the once-hot magma chamber is exposed to surface rock on the northern shore of Lake Superior.

See also
Volcanism of Canada
Volcanism of Eastern Canada
Midcontinent Rift System
Duluth Complex

References

Volcanoes of Ontario
Proterozoic volcanism
Landforms of Thunder Bay District
Igneous intrusions